Kurtziella serta, common name the wreath mangelia, is a species of sea snail, a marine gastropod mollusk in the family Mangeliidae.

Description
The length of the shell attains 10 mm.

Distribution
K. serta can be found in the Gulf of Mexico, ranging from Panama to Southern Brazil; also off Martinique.

References

 Fargo, W. G. 1953. Pliocene Mollusca of Southern Florida. Part II. The Pliocene Turridae of Saint Petersburg, Florida Monographs of the Academy of Natural Sciences of Philadelphia 18 365–409, pls. 16-24

External links

 

serta
Gastropods described in 1953